Beijing Temple of Confucius is the second-largest Confucian temple in China, after the one in Confucius's hometown of Qufu.

History
The Temple of Confucius in Beijing was built in 1302 during the reign of Temür (Emperor Chengzong) of the Yuan dynasty. Until the Xinhai Revolution, imperial officials of the Yuan, Ming and Qing dynasties hosted ceremonies to pay their formal respects to Confucius in the temple. From 1981 until 2005, the Temple of Confucius also housed part of the art collection of the Capital Museum. It stands on Guozijian Street near the Imperial Academy.

Grounds
The complex includes four courtyards aligned along a central axis. From south to north, noteworthy structures include the Gate of the Late Master (Xianshimen), the Gate of Great Accomplishment (Dachengmen), the Hall of Great Accomplishment (Dachengdian), and the Hall for Admiration of the Sage (Chongshengci).  Inside the temple, there are 198 stone tablets positioned on either side of the front courtyard, recording the names of more than 51,624 jinshis (advanced scholars) of the Yuan, Ming and Qing dynasties. There are also 14 stone stele pavilions of the Ming and Qing dynasties that hold various historical documents from late imperial China.

There is set of carved stone drums (reproducing early Zhou models) made during the reign of the Qing's Qianlong Emperor (1735–96). These are held within the Gate of Great Accomplishment. There is also a large collection of ancient Chinese musical instrument held in the Hall of Great Perfection, along with the central shrine to Confucius.

There are various carvings inside the temple ground. One notable example is a famous carving of "two flying dragons playing with a pearl among the clouds"; the image is rare among Confucius temples since it was often reserved for emperors. The temple also contains stone steles containing the Thirteen Confucian Classics, presented to the temple by the city of Jintan in Jiangsu Province.

The temple has many old trees, including one cypress tree known as the "Touch-Evil Cypress" (Chujianbai) that has been made famous by folklore through the ages. Its name derives from a Ming－era story that, when a notoriously corrupt official was passing by, the tree knocked off his hat. Afterwards people imaginated this particular tree could distinguish between good and evil.

References

External links

 Full Virtual Walk & Info on Confucius Temple, Beijing

Major National Historical and Cultural Sites in Beijing
Confucian temples in China
Religious buildings and structures in Beijing
1302 establishments in Asia
Dongcheng District, Beijing
14th-century establishments in China
14th-century Confucian temples